The Church of St. Margaret Mary is a Roman Catholic parish church under the authority of the Roman Catholic Archdiocese of New York, located at 1914 Morris Avenue in The Bronx, New York City. It was established in 1923.

Christian organizations established in 1923
Roman Catholic churches in the Bronx
1923 establishments in New York City